Sacco & Vanzetti (Italian: Sacco e Vanzetti, French: Sacco et Vanzetti) is a 1971 docudrama film written and directed by Giuliano Montaldo, based on the events surrounding the trial and execution of Nicola Sacco and Bartolomeo Vanzetti, two anarchists of Italian origin, who were sentenced to death for murdering a guard and a paymaster during the April 15, 1920, armed robbery of the Slater and Morrill Shoe Company in Braintree, Massachusetts.

The film stars Gian Maria Volonté as Vanzetti, Riccardo Cucciolla as Sacco, Cyril Cusack as prosecutor Frederick G. Katzmann, Geoffrey Keen as presiding justice Webster Thayer, Milo O'Shea as defense attorney Fred Moore, with  Rosanna Fratello, William Prince, and Sergio Fantoni. The musical score was composed and conducted by Ennio Morricone with the three-part ballad sung by Joan Baez. The film is mainly shot in colour although it both starts and finishes in black and white, and also includes period black and white newsreels.

The film was an Italian and French co-production, shot on-location in Dublin, Ireland. It was released in separate Italian and English-language versions.

Cast

Music 
The film's soundtrack was composed and conducted by Ennio Morricone, with song lyrics by the American folk singer Joan Baez. For the lyrics of "The Ballad of Sacco and Vanzetti Part 1," Baez made use of Emma Lazarus' 1883 sonnet The New Colossus, the lines of which appear inscribed on a bronze plaque in the pedestal of the Statue of Liberty.

The song "Here's to You" is sung at the end of the film. For the lyrics of "Here's to You" Baez made use of a statement attributed to Vanzetti by Philip D. Strong, a reporter for the North American Newspaper Alliance who visited Vanzetti in prison in May 1927, three months before his execution:

"Here's to You" is also included in several later films, notably in the 1978 quasi-documentary film Germany in Autumn where it accompanies footage of the funeral march for Red Army Faction members Andreas Baader, Gudrun Ensslin, and Jan-Carl Raspe, who had committed suicide in prison.

The song became known to a younger video game-playing generation, due to its appearance in the Metal Gear Solid series (both in Metal Gear Solid 4: Guns of the Patriots and Metal Gear Solid V: Ground Zeroes, where it is featured within the latter game's story).

The film soundtrack was released in a downloadable format in 2005 featuring fourteen tracks:
 "Speranze di libertà"
 "La ballata di Sacco e Vanzetti, Pt. 1"
 "Nel carcere"
 "La ballata di Sacco e Vanzetti, Pt. 2"
 "Sacco e il figlio"
 "Speranze di libertà" (#2)
 "Nel carcere" (#2)
 "La ballata di Sacco e Vanzetti, Pt. 3"
 "Libertà nella speranza"
 "E dover morire"
 "Sacco e il figlio" (#2)
 "La sedia elettrica"
 "Libertà nella speranza" (#2)
 "Here's to You"

Reception
Roger Ebert described the film as "one of the best" of the year. Ebert drew particular attention to the way that Montaldo handled his courtroom scenes: "A tricky area for any director, but one which the director handles in an interesting and maybe even brand-new way." Ebert wrote,

With regard to the historical accuracy of the film, Ebert considered the film to be 

Despite his friends' criticism that the film was "just another left-wing, European blast at the United States," Vincent Canby, in a review for The New York Times, praised the film, if for nothing more than calling "to our attention a terrible chapter in American history." Canby, however, dismissed the film as a simplification that

Canby also decried the film's soundtrack, which he described as "absolutely dreadful," with Baez's voice "used to certify the movie's noble intentions, but through the cheapest of means."

Awards
In May 1971, Sacco & Vanzetti was a competition entry at the 24th International Film Festival of Cannes where, for his portrayal of Nicola Sacco, Riccardo Cucciolla won the award for Best Actor.
Also that year, Rosanna Fratello was awarded  Best Young Actress  by the Association of Italian Film Journalists for her portrayal of Rosa Sacco (the wife of Nicola Sacco). In 1972, Morricone won from the Association of Italian Film Journalists the  Nastro d'Argento ( Silver Band ) prize in the division Best Original Score.

See also
Sacco and Vanzetti (2006 film)
The Diary of Sacco and Vanzetti

References

Further reading

External links 
 
 
 Sacco and Vanzetti Commemoration Society
 Sacco & Vanzetti, on iTunes
 Kristian Buchna: "That agony is our triumph", Ein Blog zur Geschichte des 19./20. Jahrhunderts im Film, 3 May 2012

1971 films
1971 crime drama films
Italian crime drama films
1970s Italian-language films
1970s English-language films
English-language Italian films
Films about anarchism
Courtroom films
Films about capital punishment
Films about miscarriage of justice
Films set in the 1920s
Films set in the United States
Films directed by Giuliano Montaldo
Films scored by Ennio Morricone
Films about activists
Works about Sacco and Vanzetti
1970s Italian films